São Nicolau (Portuguese for Saint Nicholas) is one of the Barlavento (Windward) islands of Cape Verde. It is located between the islands of Santa Luzia and Sal. The main towns are Ribeira Brava and Tarrafal de São Nicolau.

History

The island was discovered in 1461 or 1462 by Diogo Afonso, together with the islands of São Vicente and Santo Antão. It was first settled in the seventeenth century. The settlement Porto de Lapa was abandoned in 1653 due to pirate attacks, and the town Ribeira Brava was founded in the interior. It was the seat of the Roman Catholic Diocese of Santiago de Cabo Verde between 1786 and 1943. The roadstead of Tarrafal de São Nicolau became an anchorage for whaling ships in the 19th century. It is now the largest settlement of the island.

Geography
The mountainous island is mostly agricultural but is subject to droughts, especially in the lower lying areas. The highest point on the island is Monte Gordo (1,312 m), in the western half of the island. The eastern part is a chain of lower mountains, including Monte Bissau and Pico de Alberto.

Administrative divisions
The island is divided in two municipalities, which are subdivided into civil parishes:
Ribeira Brava 
Nossa Senhora da Lapa 
Nossa Senhora do Rosário
Tarrafal de São Nicolau 
São Francisco de Assis

Before 2005, the island was administrated as one municipality: São Nicolau.

Demography

In the 1830s, São Nicolau had an estimated population of 5,000.

Transportation
The island has a domestic airport, São Nicolau Airport, located between Ribeira Brava and Preguiça. There is a port at Tarrafal de São Nicolau, with ferry connections to the islands of São Vicente (Mindelo) and Santiago (Praia).

Notable residents
Teofilo Chantre (b. 1964), musician
Baltasar Lopes da Silva (1907 - 1989), writer
José Lopes da Silva (pseudonym: Gabrial Mariano, (1928–2003), poet and essayist
Antónia Pusich, Portuguese poet, journalist, pianist and compositor of Croatian origin, daughter of the colonial governor António Pusich
António Maria de Bettencourt Rodrigues (1854-1933), doctor, diplomat and politician

References

External links

 caboverde.com

 
Islands of Cape Verde